Loyola Escuela Empresarial para las Américas is a university in Guatemala.

External links
Official site

Universities in Guatemala